The 1999–2000 FIS Cross-Country World Cup was the 19th official World Cup season in cross-country skiing for men and women. The season began on 27 November 1999 in Kiruna, Sweden and finished on 19 March 2000 in Bormio, Italy. Johann Mühlegg of Spain won the men's cup, and Bente Skari of Norway won the women's.  

The 1999–2000 World Cup season is the only season where a Middle Distance Cup has been arranged.

Calendar

Men

Women

Men's team

Women's team

Men's standings

Overall

Long Distance

Middle Distance

Sprint

Women's standings

Overall

Long Distance

Middle Distance

Sprint

Achievements
Victories in this World Cup (all-time number of victories as of 1999/2000 season in parentheses)

Men
 , 4 (4) first places
 , 3 (4) first places
 , 3 (3) first places
 , 2 (7) first places
 , 1 (9) first place
 , 1 (6) first place
 , 1 (2) first place
 , 1 (2) first place
 , 1 (1) first place
 , 1 (1) first place
 , 1 (1) first place
 , 1 (1) first place
 , 1 (1) first place

Women
 , 5 (15) first places
 , 4 (19) first places
 , 4 (5) first places
 , 2 (21) first places
 , 2 (4) first places
 , 2 (3) first places
 , 1 (5) first place
 , 1 (1) first place

References

External links

FIS Cross-Country World Cup seasons
World Cup 1999-00
World Cup 1999-00